David Wilson Smith (7 July 1875 – 1947) was a Scottish footballer who played in the Football League for Middlesbrough and Notts County.

References

1875 births
1947 deaths
Scottish footballers
English Football League players
Association football midfielders
Lochgelly United F.C. players
Cowdenbeath F.C. players
Third Lanark A.C. players
Chatham Town F.C. players
Millwall F.C. players
Notts County F.C. players
Middlesbrough F.C. players
People from Lochgelly
Footballers from Fife